Freitas may refer to:

People

Sports 
 Alcindo Martha de Freitas, Brazilian football player
 Acelino Freitas (born 1975), Brazilian boxer
 Getúlio Vargas Freitas Oliveira Júnior (born 1983), Brazilian football player
 Jesse Freitas (American football, born 1921), American football player
 Jesse Freitas (American football, born 1951), his son, American football player
 Makoa Freitas (born 1979), American football player
 Márcio Miranda Freitas Rocha da Silva (born 1981), Brazilian football player
 Miguel Freitas (born 1984), Portuguese racing driver
 Pedro Henrique Carvalho Freitas (born 1985), Brazilian football player
 Rocky Freitas (1945–2022), American football player
 Tony Freitas (1908–1994), American baseball pitcher

Other professions 

Ángela Freitas, East Timorese politician
 Diogo Freitas do Amaral (1941–2019), Portuguese politician
 Eduardo Freitas, Portuguese motorsports official and race director
 Nick Freitas (born 1979), American politician
 Paulin Freitas (1909–1989), Togolese politician and diplomat
 Robert Freitas (born 1952), American nanotechnologist

Places 
 Freitas (Portugal), a village in Fafe, Portugal
 Estádio Bento Freitas, a stadium in Pelotas, Brazil
 Mark Edward Freitas Ice Forum, a hockey rink in Connecticut, United States

See also 
 Freitas (surname)
 De Freitas (disambiguation)

Portuguese-language surnames